Gasparo Serenari (active 1760) was an Italian painter of the 18th century, active in Rome and his native Palermo.

Biography
He was a pupil of Sebastiano Conca in Rome. He painted altarpieces for the churches of Santa Maria in Trivio and Santa Maria Maddalena in Rome. He was knighted for his work, and appears to have become a cleric. He returned to Palermo where he painted mainly in churches, including that of the Jesuits and the monastery of La Carita.

References

Year of death missing
Painters from Palermo
18th-century Italian painters
Italian male painters
Italian Baroque painters
18th-century Italian male artists